Lost in Karastan is a 2014 black comedy film directed by Ben Hopkins.

Plot 
Lost in Karastan is a gentle black comedy about a confused British director, Emil, who is hired to direct a production in the Caucasus region. The country, Autonomous Republic of Karastan, is led by an eccentric corrupt but benign dictator. There Emil embarks on one of the wildest journeys of his already diverse career.

Cast 
 Matthew Macfadyen as Emil Forester
 MyAnna Buring as Chulpan
 Noah Taylor as Xan Butler
 Ali Cook as Daniel
 Ümit Ünal as Saro
 Richard Van Weyden as President Abashiliev
 Vedat Erincin as Mountain Man
 María Fernández Ache as Marian
 Amiran Katchibaia as Agdur
 Leo Antadze as Igor
 Lasha Ramishvili as Ruslan
 Dato Velijanashvili as  Shadow

Release
Lost in Karastan premiered in the UK as the opening film of the London Comedy Film Festival (LOCO) on 22 January 2015.

Awards
At Filmfest Hamburg, the film won the 'Hamburg Producers Awards' for the best 'European Cinema Co-production' and 'German-European Cinematic Production', presented to Daniel Zuta and Vladimer Katcharava.

Ben Hopkins was nominated for the 'Grand Prix des Amériques' award at the Montréal World Film Festival in 2014.

References

External links
 Official website
 Internet Movie Database
 LOCO
 BFI
 Ben Hopkins Interview (in German)

2014 films
English-language German films
English-language French films
English-language films from Georgia (country)
2014 black comedy films
German black comedy films
British black comedy films
Films set in Asia
French black comedy films
2010s Russian-language films
2010s Turkish-language films
Comedy films from Georgia (country)
2010s English-language films
2014 multilingual films
British multilingual films
French multilingual films
German multilingual films
Multilingual films from Georgia (country)
2010s British films
2010s French films
2010s German films